The Killing Game Show is a run and gun video game developed by Raising Hell Software for the Amiga and Atari ST. It was published in 1990 by Psygnosis,  then re-released later under the name Fatal Rewind for the Sega Genesis by Electronic Arts.

Gameplay
The player controls the robo-contestant as it fights for its life, avoiding booby traps, H.A.L.F, enemies, and the ever-present rising acid. There are 12 levels.

References

External links
The Killing Game Show at the Hall of Light
The Killing Game Show at Atari Mania
Fatal Rewind at Sega-16

1990 video games
Amiga games
Atari ST games
Electronic Arts games
Psygnosis games
Run and gun games
Sega Genesis games
Single-player video games
Video games about death games
Video games about robots
Video games scored by Tim Wright (Welsh musician)
Video games developed in the United Kingdom
Bizarre Creations games